Enrique Castelló (13 February 1938 – 10 March 2009) is a Spanish rower. He competed in the men's coxed pair event at the 1960 Summer Olympics.

References

1938 births
2009 deaths
Spanish male rowers
Olympic rowers of Spain
Rowers at the 1960 Summer Olympics
Sportspeople from Seville